Propyria criton is a moth in the subfamily Arctiinae. It was described by Herbert Druce in 1885. It is found in Guatemala.

References

Moths described in 1885
Cisthenina